The 1965 Rutgers Scarlet Knights football team represented Rutgers University in the 1965 NCAA University Division football season. In their sixth season under head coach John F. Bateman, the Scarlet Knights compiled a 3–6 record, were co-champions of the Middle Three Conference championship, and were outscored by their opponents 152 to 84. The team's statistical leaders included Jack Callaghan with 456 passing yards, Rich Capria with 242 rushing yards, and Charley Mudie with 243 receiving yards.

The Scarlet Knights played their home games at Rutgers Stadium in Piscataway, New Jersey, across the river from the university's main campus in New Brunswick.

Schedule

References

Rutgers
Rutgers Scarlet Knights football seasons
Rutgers Scarlet Knights football